Jón Halldórsson ( - 1339) was a Roman Catholic clergyman who became bishop of Iceland.

Jón Halldórsson may also refer to:

 Jón Halldórsson (athlete, born 1889)
 Jón Halldórsson (athlete, born 1982)